The 2012 Samsung Mobile 500 was a NASCAR Sprint Cup Series stock car race held on April 14, 2012, at Texas Motor Speedway in Fort Worth, Texas. Contested over 334 laps, it was the seventh race of the 2012 season. Greg Biffle of RFK Racing took his first win of the season, while Jimmie Johnson finished second and Mark Martin finished third.

Report

Background

Texas Motor Speedway, is one of ten intermediate to hold NASCAR races; the others are Atlanta Motor Speedway, Kansas Speedway, Chicagoland Speedway, Darlington Raceway, Homestead Miami Speedway, New Hampshire Motor Speedway, Kentucky Speedway, Las Vegas Motor Speedway, and Charlotte Motor Speedway. The track's turns are banked at twenty-four degrees, while the front stretch, the location of the finish line, is five degrees. The back stretch, opposite of the front, also has a five degree banking. The racetrack has seats for 191,122 spectators.

Before the race, Greg Biffle led the Drivers' Championship with 226 points, and Dale Earnhardt Jr. stood in second with 220. Tony Stewart, Matt Kenseth, Kevin Harvick and Martin Truex Jr. followed in the next four positions with 214 points. Denny Hamlin with 210 points, was eight points ahead of Ryan Newman and 18 ahead of Clint Bowyer in eighth and ninth. Jimmie Johnson, with 189, was ten points ahead of Carl Edwards in eleventh. Brad Keselowski completed the first twelve positions with 175 points, 51 points behind Biffle. In the Manufacturers' Championship, Chevrolet was leading with 42 points, nine points ahead of Ford. Toyota, with 30 points, was three points ahead of Dodge in the battle for third. Kenseth was the race's defending race winner after winning it in 2011.

Practice and qualifying
Two practice sessions were held before the race; the first on April 12, 2012 which lasted 120 minutes. The second and final practice session was held on the following day and lasted 90 minutes. Mark Martin was quickest with a time of 28.507 seconds in the first session, less than four-hundredths of a second faster than Biffle. Harvick was just off Biffle's pace, followed by A. J. Allmendinger, Regan Smith, and Marcos Ambrose. Kenseth was seventh, still within two-tenths of a second of Martin's time. In the second and final practice session, Trevor Bayne was quickest with a time of 29.246 seconds. Biffle followed in the second position, ahead of Kenseth, Bowyer, and Allmendinger. Harvick was sixth after posting a time of 29.355 seconds, while Hamlin and Kurt Busch followed in seventh and eighth. Truex Jr. and Joey Logano rounded out the first ten positions.

Forty-six cars were entered for qualifying, but only forty-three raced because of NASCAR's qualifying procedure. Truex Jr. clinched his seventh pole position during his career, with a time of 28.366 seconds. He was joined on the front row of the grid by Kenseth. Biffle qualified third, Martin took fourth, and Kasey Kahne started fifth. Newman, Ambrose, Keselowski, Jamie McMurray, and Johnson rounded out the first ten positions. The drivers who failed to qualify for the race were David Stremme, Joe Nemechek and Stacy Compton. Once the qualifying session concluded, Truex Jr. said, "That's our main goal. This team's good enough. We can get to Victory Lane. We're going to do it soon. I feel good about this team. I'm just having so much fun coming to the race track and driving these cars. We're going to make them proud here pretty quick."

Notes

 The last 234 laps went green, setting a NASCAR record for the longest consecutive green flag run on an intermediate track.

References

Samsung Mobile 500
Samsung Mobile 500
Samsung Mobile 500
2010s in Fort Worth, Texas
NASCAR races at Texas Motor Speedway